George Bean (7 March 1864 – 16 March 1923) was a cricketer who played first-class cricket for Sussex County Cricket Club between 1886 and 1898. He also played three Test matches for England in 1891–92.

Career
In 1885 Bean played an unsuccessful season for his home county of Nottinghamshire before moving on to Sussex. His most successful season was in 1891, which earned him a place on Lord Sheffield's tour to Australia in 1891/2, but he did not excel himself on the tour, and his form suffered further in 1892, ruling him out of further England contention. He had his Sussex benefit in 1893. After playing for Sussex, he moved onto the Lord's groundstaff and was a senior member there on his death. He had a successful benefit at Lord's in 1921.

Death
Bean died of pneumonia on 16 March 1923. His wife was Eliza predeceased him by approximately 9 years.

References

1864 births
1923 deaths
Cricketers from Sutton-in-Ashfield
English cricketers
England Test cricketers
Nottinghamshire cricketers
Sussex cricketers
English cricket umpires
Marylebone Cricket Club cricketers
North v South cricketers
Players cricketers
Players of the South cricketers
Deaths from pneumonia in England
Lord March's XI cricketers